Acateno Municipality is municipality in Puebla in south-eastern Mexico.

References 

Municipalities of Puebla